The 2020 Idaho Senate election took place as part of the biennial 2020 United States elections. Idaho voters elected state senators in all of the state's 35 senate districts. State senators serve two-year terms in the Idaho Senate.

No seats changed hands in the election, with the closest, the Moscow-based District 5, being within one percentage point of flipping.

Retirements
Six incumbents did not run for re-election in 2020. Those incumbents are:

Republicans
District 3: Don Cheatham: Retiring
District 23: Bert Brackett: Retiring
District 30: Dean Mortimer: Retiring
District 34: Brent Hill: Retiring

Democrats
District 17: Maryanne Jordan: Retiring
District 19: Cherie Buckner-Webb: Retiring

Predictions

Results summary

Close races

Summary of results by State Senate District

Detailed Results

See also
2020 Idaho elections

References

2020 Idaho elections
Idaho Senate
Idaho Senate elections